Khaloo Hossein Bord khuni Dashti (1868–1946) who people of Bord Khun (Bushehr Province) fought British Forces c. 1915 in south of Iran (in World War I).

See also
Rais Ali Delvari
Wilhelm Wassmuss
Persian Campaign

References

People from Bushehr Province